Rosalie King (born Rosa Lea Frances Stephens, August 23, 1902, Jacksonville, Florida – died June 11, 1997, Ocala, Florida), also known as Rosalie Simpson, was an American character actress and singer.

She appeared on radio in The Maxwell House Coffee Hour. She was an original member of the Katherine Dunham Company, leaving because of the troupe's proposed tour of Australia and New Zealand (1956–1957), citing the distance from her children. The decision also cost the company the services of her husband, basso profondo Gordon Simpson, for which she later said that Dunham never fully forgave her. She also performed with the Eva Jessye Choir.

King was known for the timbre of her contralto voice. She became a favourite of playwright Langston Hughes, who wrote original material for her. She costarred in his play Jericho-Jim Crow in 1964.

King's career was cut short by a stroke in the mid-1960s. She recovered from it but retired from the stage, doing only occasional performances and consultancies in the 1970s and 1980s. In her later years, King was credited as Rosalie Simpson, her married name from her second marriage. Her stage credits are sometimes confused with those of her daughter, Rosalie King, Jr., a child actor turned educator. Rosalie King died in Ocala, Florida in 1997.

Selected Broadway credits
Lovely Ladies, Kind Gentlemen – 1971 – Okinawan/American
Tambourines to Glory – 1963 – Mattie Morningside
Porgy and Bess – original and 1942 revival
Lew Leslie's Blackbirds of 1939
Roll, Sweet Chariot – 1934
Run, Little Chillun – 1933 – Sister Mahalie Ockletree
Bal Nègre – 1946: Flaming Youth, 1927'' – The Blues Singer

References

External links

American stage actresses
Actresses from Jacksonville, Florida
1902 births
1997 deaths
20th-century American actresses
20th-century American singers